New Zealand participated at the 2010 Winter Olympics in Vancouver, British Columbia, Canada. 16 athletes were named by 28 January 2010.

Alpine skiing

Biathlon

Cross-country skiing

Freestyle skiing

Short track speed skating

Skeleton

Snowboarding 

Men's halfpipe

Women's halfpipe

Speed skating

See also
 New Zealand at the 2010 Winter Paralympics

References

2010 in New Zealand sport
Nations at the 2010 Winter Olympics
2010